Rani Kasula Rangamma is a 1981 Telugu language film starring Chiranjeevi and Sridevi.

Plot 
Sukumar, the son of a rich industrialist, is a spoilt man who takes advantage of innocent village girls. However, when Roja complains to his father, the two conspire to teach Sukumar a lesson.

Cast 
 Chiranjeevi as Sukumar Babu
 Sridevi as Rani Kasula Rangamma / Roja
 Jaggayya
 Nutan Prasad as Seetanna
 Rallapalli as Kannayya
 Allu Rama Lingaiah
 Jayamalini as Rita / Lucy in item number

Soundtrack

References

External links

1981 films
1980s Telugu-language films
Films scored by K. Chakravarthy
Films directed by T. L. V. Prasad